Robert Patrick Sullivan (July 1, 1921 – April 12, 2007) was an American professional basketball player. He played for the Oshkosh All-Stars in the National Basketball League for four total seasons, averaging 3.0 points per game for his career. In college, he played baseball and basketball for the University of Wisconsin, and won a national championship in 1940–41 with the basketball team.

Sullivan played minor league baseball in 1946 and 1947 as well, suiting up for the Green Bay Bluejays in the Wisconsin State League.

After his basketball and baseball careers, Sullivan worked for a process design and build company specializing in the management and monetizing of organic waste streams.

References

1921 births
2007 deaths
American men's basketball players
Baseball players from Saint Paul, Minnesota
Basketball players from Saint Paul, Minnesota
Basketball players from Wisconsin
Forwards (basketball)
Green Bay Bluejays players
Guards (basketball)
Oshkosh All-Stars players
United States Navy personnel of World War II
Wisconsin Badgers baseball players
Wisconsin Badgers men's basketball players